The  is a law enforcement agency under the National Public Safety Commission of the Cabinet Office. It is the central agency of the Japanese police system, and the central coordinating agency of law enforcement in situations of national emergency in Japan.

Unlike other national police in other countries, the NPA does not have any operational units of its own aside from the Imperial Guard. Instead, its role is to supervise prefectural police and determine general standards and policies, though in national emergencies or large-scale disasters the agency is authorized to take command of prefectural police.

As of 2017, the NPA has a strength of approximately 7,800 personnel: 2,100 sworn officers, 900 guards, and 4,800 civilian staff.

History
But after the surrender of Japan, the Supreme Commander for the Allied Powers regarded this centralized police system as undemocratic.

During the occupation, the principle of decentralization was introduced by the 1947 Police Law. But most Japanese municipalities were too small to have a large police force, so sometimes they were unable to deal with large-scale violence. In addition, excessive fragmentation of the police organization reduced the efficiency of police activities.

As a response to these problems, complete restructuring created a more centralized system under the 1954 amended Police Law. All operational units except for the Imperial Guard were reorganized into prefectural police for each prefecture, and the National Police Agency was established as the central coordinating agency for these Police Departments.

Organization

Leadership 
The  is the highest ranking police officer of Japan, regarded as an exception to the regular class structure. The  are their staff. The civilian political leadership is provided by the National Public Safety Commission.

Internal Bureaus

Community Safety Bureau 
The  is responsible for crime prevention, combating juvenile delinquency, and pollution control.

This bureau was derived from the Safety Division of the Criminal Affairs Bureau in 1994.

Criminal Affairs Bureau
The  is in charge of research statistics and coordination of the criminal investigation of nationally important and international cases.

 (Direct reporting divisions)

Traffic Bureau
The  is responsible for traffic policing and regulations.

Security Bureau

The  is in charge of the internal security affairs, such as counter-intelligence, counter-terrorism or disaster response.

 (Direct reporting divisions)
 
 
 
 
 
 

After the 1996 Japanese embassy hostage crisis in Peru, the Security Bureau established the Terrorism Response Team where officers liaise with foreign law enforcement and intelligence agencies when Japanese interests or nationals are in danger. It was later reformed to the Terrorism Response Team - Tactical Wing (TRT-2) for Overseas in order to meet with demands to coordinate with foreign police forces in assisting them whenever a terror attack has happened.

Info-Communications Bureau
The  supervises police communications systems and combat with cyberterrorism.

Local Branch Bureaus and Departments

Regional Police Bureaus
There are six , each responsible for a number of prefectures as below:

 Aomori, Iwate, Miyagi, Akita, Yamagata, and Fukushima Prefectures

 Ibaraki, Tochigi, Gunma, Saitama, Chiba, Kanagawa, Niigata, Yamanashi, Nagano, and Shizuoka Prefectures

 Toyama, Ishikawa, Fukui, Gifu, Aichi, and Mie Prefectures

 Shiga, Kyoto, Osaka, Hyogo, Nara, and Wakayama Prefectures

 Tottori, Shimane, Okayama, Hiroshima, and Yamaguchi Prefectures
 Tokushima, Kagawa, Ehime, and Kochi Prefectures

 Fukuoka, Saga, Nagasaki, Kumamoto, Oita, Miyazaki, Kagoshima, and Okinawa Prefectures

They are located in major cities of each geographic region. The Tokyo Metropolitan Police Department and Hokkaido Prefectural Police Headquarters are excluded from the jurisdiction of regional police bureaus. Headed by a Senior Commissioner, each regional police bureaus exercises necessary control and supervision over and provides support services to prefectural police within its jurisdiction, under the authority and orders of NPA's Commissioner General. Attached to each Regional Police Bureaus is a Regional Police School which provides police personnel with education and training required of staff officers as well as other necessary education and training.

Police Communications Departments
Metropolitan Tokyo and the island of Hokkaidō are excluded from the regional jurisdictions and are run more autonomously than other local forces, in the case of Tokyo, because of its special urban situation, and of Hokkaidō, because of its distinctive geography. The National Police Agency maintains police communications divisions in these two areas to handle any coordination needed between national and local forces. In other area, Police Communications Departments are established within each Regional Police Bureaus.

 Independent Communications Departments

Subsidiary Organs

See also

Police services of the Empire of Japan
Law enforcement in Japan
Public order and internal security in Japan
Fire and Disaster Management Agency

References

External links

Official website 
Official website 
 

Cabinet Office (Japan)
1954 establishments in Japan
Government agencies established in 1954
Law enforcement agencies of Japan
National Central Bureaus of Interpol
Anti–child pornography organizations